Palakkad South is a region in Palakkad city consisting of the southern suburbs of the city. Kanjikode Industrial Area, the second largest industrial area in Kerala after Kochi forms part of Palakkad South. Indian Institute of Technology, Palakkad, first and the only Indian Institute of Technology in Kerala also forms part. South police station is located at Kunnathurmedu.

Suburbs
Chandranagar
East Yakkara
Manapullikavu
Marutharode
Nurani
Kanjikode
Kunnathurmedu
Pudussery West
Pudussery Central
Thirunellai
Vennakkara
West Yakkara

Institutions
Indian Institute of Technology, Palakkad
Government Medical College, Palakkad
Ahalia Edu-Health Campus, Palakkad

Facilities
Map view of facilities in and around Palakkad

Things to Do
Map view of things to do in and around palakkad

See also
Palakkad North

References

 
Suburbs of Palakkad
Cities and towns in Palakkad district